Timocratica isarga is a moth of the family Depressariidae. It is found in Bolivia.

The wingspan is about 40 mm. The forewings and hindwings are white, beneath also wholly white.

References

Moths described in 1925
Timocratica